John G. Hayes, Sr. (July 17, 1919 – December 8, 1998), was a harness racing driver/trainer/owner who was inducted into the Canadian and American Harness Racing Halls of Fame.

Born in Oshawa, Ontario, Canada, he was the son of a dairy farmer who went on to become a prominent figure in harness racing and the first Canadian to be selected to the Little Brown Jug's Wall of Fame. His greatest accomplishment was in training horses in particular when he developed the great champion, Strike Out.

A longtime director of the Canadian Trotting Association, for ten years John Hayes served as its president and was Vice-Chairman of the Ontario Racing Commission.

It had been Hayes' lifelong dream to win the Little Brown Jug and was famous for having told a newspaper reporter: "I'd rather win the Little Brown Jug than go to heaven." When he died in 1998, the Little Brown Jug itself, won by Strike Out in 1972, was placed at the head of his casket.

John Hayes was inducted into the Little Brown Jug Wall of Fame in 1990, the Canadian Horse Racing Hall of Fame in 1991, and the United States Harness Racing Hall of Fame in 2005.

Beejay Stable 
The Beejay Stable was a harness racing stable and breeding business owned by John Hayes as managing partner in a partnership formed in 1959 with Montreal's Shapiro brothers, Conrad, Leo, and Robert. Among the horses owned by the partnership were Sharp 'n' Smart, Penn Hanover, Keystone Pat, Alley Fighter, and their most successful, the Hall of Fame pacer, Strike Out.  Twenty-five years after the partnership was first formed, they established the Quarter Century Club as a vehicle for investments in various racing stock such as a share in sire Albatross and businesses including Castleton Farm and the Tattersalls Sales Company in Lexington, Kentucky.

References

1919 births
1998 deaths
Canadian harness racing drivers
Canadian harness racing trainers
Canadian Horse Racing Hall of Fame inductees
United States Harness Racing Hall of Fame inductees
Canadian racehorse owners and breeders
Sportspeople from Oshawa